Henry William Crosbie Ward, 5th Viscount Bangor DL, JP (26 July 1828 – 23 February 1911), styled The Honourable from birth until 1881, was an Irish peer, Conservative politician and soldier.

Background
He was the second son of Edward Ward, 3rd Viscount Bangor and his wife Harriet Margaret Maxwell, second daughter of Henry Maxwell, 6th Baron Farnham. Ward was educated at Rugby School and then at the Royal Military College, Sandhurst. In 1881, he succeeded his older brother Edward as viscount.

Career
Ward entered the British Army in 1846 and served in the 43rd (Monmouthshire) Regiment of Foot. He fought in the Xhosa Wars and retired in 1854 as captain. In 1886, Ward was elected a representative peer to the House of Lords. He was a Deputy Lieutenant of County Down and represented the county also as Justice of the Peace.

Family
On 6 December 1854, he married the Irish entomologist, microscopist, and writer Mary King, a cousin of the astronomer and naturalist William Parsons, 3rd Earl of Rosse, and the pioneering photographer Mary Rosse. The couple had five daughters and three sons. Mary Ward (nee King) died in 1869 in history's first car accident, when she was a passenger of an experimental steam car built by the Rosses in Parsonstown.

Henry Ward remarried Elizabeth Eccles, only daughter of Major Hugh Eccles of Cronroe on 8 April 1874. His second marriage was childless. Ward died, aged 82 at his residence Castle Ward and was buried at Ballycutter four days later. He was succeeded in the viscountcy by his youngest and only surviving son Maxwell.

References

1828 births
1911 deaths
19th-century Irish people
People from County Down
Deputy Lieutenants of Down
Irish representative peers
People educated at Rugby School
43rd Regiment of Foot officers
Graduates of the Royal Military College, Sandhurst
Henry
Henry